Forest Hill Park is an historic urban park that was a portion of John D. Rockefeller's estate, located in East Cleveland and Cleveland Heights, Ohio. Two-thirds of the park lie in East Cleveland, and the remaining third is in Cleveland Heights. The  park has six baseball diamonds (four lit), six lit tennis courts and walking trails that have retained the natural green space as intended by John D. Rockefeller, Jr., who deeded the park to the two cities in 1936. Albert Davis Taylor was the park's landscape architect. It is the largest single body of green space between two large metroparks on the far east and west sides of Cleveland.

History 
The park was bought by Rockefeller in 1873 as a summer estate, which was used by Rockefeller's family until 1915. A fire destroyed the estate house in 1917. In 1939 Rockefeller transferred 1/3 (one-third) of the property to Cleveland Heights and 2/3 (two-thirds) to East Cleveland.

On February 27, 1998, it was added to the National Register of Historic Places.

See also
Forest Hill, Ohio

References

External links

 Community Resources, Parks & Gardens: Forest Hill Park 

Cleveland Heights, Ohio
East Cleveland, Ohio
Parks in Ohio
Protected areas of Cuyahoga County, Ohio
Rockefeller family
National Register of Historic Places in Cuyahoga County, Ohio
Historic districts on the National Register of Historic Places in Ohio
Works Progress Administration in Ohio
Parks on the National Register of Historic Places in Ohio